Kuhn, Loeb & Co. was an American multinational investment bank founded in 1867 by Abraham Kuhn and his brother-in-law Solomon Loeb. Under the leadership of Jacob H. Schiff, Loeb's son-in-law, it grew to be one of the most influential investment banks in the late 19th and early 20th centuries, financing America's expanding railways and growth companies, including Western Union and Westinghouse, and thereby becoming the principal rival of J.P. Morgan & Co.

In the years following Schiff's death in 1920, the firm was led by Otto Kahn and Felix Warburg, men who had already solidified their roles as Schiff's able successors.  However, the firm's fortunes began to fade following World War II, when it failed to keep pace with a rapidly changing investment banking industry, in which Kuhn, Loeb's old-world, genteel ways, did not seem to fit; the days of the gentleman-banker had passed.

The firm lost its independence from the Bulge Bracket in 1977 when it merged with Lehman Brothers, creating Lehman Brothers, Kuhn, Loeb Inc. The combined firm was itself acquired in 1984 by American Express, forming Shearson Lehman/American Express and with that, the Kuhn, Loeb name was retired.

History
Kuhn, Loeb & Co. was an investment bank located in New York City.  It was founded in 1867, by Abraham Kuhn and Solomon Loeb. Kuhn and Loeb had created a successful merchandising business in Cincinnati, Ohio, when they decided to move east, to New York, to take advantage of the country's burgeoning economic expansion.  Company records indicate that by the time Kuhn and Loeb established their partnership, they were able to capitalize it at $500,000 (equivalent of about $ million in ).  On January 1, 1875, Jacob Schiff (1847–1920), Solomon Loeb's son-in-law, joined the firm.  He eventually became its leader and grew the firm into the second most prestigious investment bank in the United States behind J. Pierpont Morgan's J.P. Morgan & Co.

The firm grew to prominence during the railroad era in the United States. Americans saw great hope and promise in railroads and investors saw great opportunities to profit.  Kuhn, Loeb, like all investment banks, brought capital together with commercial opportunity.  Its first meaningful entry into railroad financing was in 1877 when it raised funds for the Chicago and North Western Railroad, and several years later, in 1881, for the Pennsylvania Railroad and the Chicago, Milwaukee & St. Paul Railroad.

Schiff was instrumental in the reorganization of the Union Pacific in 1897, helping to place the firm on sound financial footing.  In 1901, with Kuhn, Loeb's financial support, E. H. Harriman famously battled James Jerome Hill and J.P. Morgan to acquire control of the Northern Pacific Railroad.

The firm was long associated with many of America's emerging industrial giants, providing financial backing for Westinghouse and Western Union, as well as innovative consumer giants like the Polaroid Corporation.  The firm also enjoyed respect as a trusted adviser overseas, providing services to numerous foreign governments, including the governments of Austria, Finland, Mexico and Venezuela.

It also acted as the leading investment house for John D. Rockefeller, through the guidance of his investment adviser, Frederick T. Gates. Rockefeller invested in many syndicates with the bank, including major stakes in the prominent railroad companies, as well as contributing to its consolidation of the Chicago meatpackers, which resulted in the formation of a leading trust. Overseas ventures that Rockefeller also got involved with included the bank's loans to the Chinese and Imperial Japanese governments.

The firm also joined a partnership with Rockefeller in 1911 to gain control of the Equitable Trust Company, which was later to merge and become the Chase Bank.

Famous partners of the firm included Otto Kahn, Paul Warburg, Felix Warburg, Mortimer Schiff, Benjamin Buttenwieser, Abraham Wolff, Lewis Strauss, and Sigmund Warburg, founder of S.G. Warburg. 

In its early years, intermarriage among the German-Jewish elite was common.  Consequently, the partners of Kuhn, Loeb were closely related by blood and marriage to the partners of J & W Seligman, Speyer & Co., Goldman, Sachs & Co., Lehman Brothers and other prominent German-Jewish firms.  Prior to the Second World War, a particularly close relationship existed between the partners of Kuhn, Loeb and M. M. Warburg & Co. of Hamburg, Germany, through Paul and Felix, who were Kuhn, Loeb partners.  Later on, following World War II, their cousin Sigmund Warburg would briefly continue this relationship as a partner and Executive Director of the firm.

The firm's fortunes began to fade in the years following World War II.  Wall Street was changing and shifting away from relationship banking.  Kuhn, Loeb's world of gentlemen bankers was gradually being replaced by a more aggressive, transaction-oriented Wall Street, with underwriters entering the trenches and selling securities directly to the public—territory Kuhn, Loeb stubbornly refused to enter.  When asked how many people worked at Kuhn, Loeb, one partner famously quipped, "about half".  Such was life at Kuhn, Loeb, resting on its laurels, while Wall Street passed it by.

In 1977, facing a capital crisis, the firm succumbed and merged with Lehman Brothers, to form Lehman Brothers, Kuhn, Loeb Inc.  Internationally, the merged firms were known as Kuhn Loeb Lehman Brothers Inc., in recognition Kuhn Loeb's superior international reputation.

The merger did not, however, prove to be the panacea to what ailed Kuhn, Loeb.  Indeed, as detailed more closely in the Lehman Brothers history, a period of bitter internal strife ended in 1984 when the firm sold itself to Shearson/American Express, itself the product of a recent merger between American Express and Sandy Weill's, Shearson Loeb Rhoades.  The combined firms then dropped the Kuhn, Loeb name and became known as Shearson Lehman/American Express, ending Kuhn, Loeb's almost 120 years on Wall Street.

Later, the combined firm purchased E.F. Hutton, becoming Shearson Lehman Hutton.  Ultimately, however, American Express could not make the pieces of its financial services supermarket work.  In 1993, under then newly appointed CEO, Harvey Golub, the firm sold its retail brokerage operations to Primerica.  In 1994, it spun off a beleaguered Lehman Brothers as Lehman Brothers Holdings Inc., in an initial public offering.

Although the Kuhn, Loeb name is probably gone forever, the firm's legacy is not.  Former Kuhn, Loeb employees remain in senior positions throughout Wall Street, and until recently, at Lehman Brothers.  Vestiges of the firm survived in the form of Lehman Brothers' extensive fixed income capabilities, including many of their bond indices, such as the Government/Credit index.  This index, originally created in 1973 by Kuhn, Loeb, as the Government/Corporate index, was among the first generation of bond index data to measure the fixed income market.  It is still the preeminent benchmark in its class.

Successors
The following is an illustration of the company's mergers and its role in later successor firms, notably Lehman Brothers Kuhn Loeb, Shearson Lehman Brothers and later Lehman Brothers (this is not a comprehensive list):

Partners of the Firm

General Partners

 Abraham Kuhn (1867–1887)
 Solomon Loeb^ (1867–1899)
 Samuel Wolff (1867–1872)
 Samuel Kuhn (1868–1869)
 Jacob Netter (1867–1869)
 Jacob H. Schiff^ (1875–1920)
 Abraham Wolff (1875–1900)
 Michael Gernsheim (1875–1881)
 Lewis S. Wolff (1884–1891)
 James Loeb (1894–1901)
 Louis A. Heinsheimer (1894–1909)
 Felix M. Warburg (1897–1937)
 Otto H. Kahn^ (1897–1934)
 Mortimer L. Schiff (1900–1931)
 Paul M. Warburg (1903–1914)
 Jerome J. Hanauer** (1912–1932)
 Gordon Leith (London) (1927–1930)
 George W. Bovenizer (1929–1961)
 Lewis L. Strauss (1929–1946)
 Sir William Wiseman, Bart. (1929–1960)
 John M. Schiff^ (1931 – ?)
 Frederick M. Warburg (1931 – ?)
 Gilbert W. Kahn (1931 – ?)
 Benjamin J. Buttenwieser (1932–1949)
 Hugh Knowlton (1932 – ?)
 Elisha Walker (1933–1950)
 Percy M. Stewart (1941 – ?)
 Robert F. Brown (1941 – ?)
 Robert E. Walker (1949–1958)
 J. Emerson Thors (1949 – ?)
 J. Richardson Dilworth (1952–1958)
 Jonas C. Andersen (1955–1956)
 Sir Siegmund G. Warburg (London) (1956–1964)
 David T. Miralia (1957 – ?)
 Kenneth N. Hall (1956 – ?)
 Henry Necarsulmer (1956–1977)
 Charles J. Ely (1956 – ?)
 Bernard Einhorn (1965–1967)
 Nathaniel Samuels^ (1955–1974)
 Morris H. Wright
 John M. Leonard
 Alvin E. Friedman (1962 – ?)
 John S. Guest (1962 – ?)
 Jerome S. Katzin (1962–1977)
 John T. Monzani (1962–?)
 H. Spottswood White (1962–?)
 Thomas E. Dewey Jr. (1966–1975)
 Andre Istel (1964–1966)
 Harvey M. Krueger^ (1965–1977)
 Anthony M. Lund
 William H. Todd
 Yves-Andres Istel (1966 – ?)
 John K. Libby (1967–1977)
 James H. Manges (1967 – ?)
 David T. Schiff (1967 – ?)
 Sydney S. Netreba (1968 – ?)
 Sidney J. Sauerhaft (1968 – ?)
 Joseph F. Schwartz (1968 – ?)
 John Barry Ryan III (1969 -)
 Edgar R. Koerner (1969 – ?)
 Archie E. Albright (1969 – ?)
 Mark C. Feer (1969–1977)
 W. Richard Bingham (1970 – ?)
 James A. Favia (1970 – ?)
 William M. Kearns Jr. (1970 – ?)
 Norman W. Stewart (1970 – ?)
 Clifford W. Michel (1972 – ?)
 Robert M. Shepard (1973–1977)

** First non-family member to be admitted to the partnership. 
^ Indicates status as former managing partner

Partnership Summary Data
 67 General Partners
 Longest Serving Partners: Jacob H. Schiff (45 years), Felix M. Warburg (40 years)

Clients of the Firm

American Smelting and Refining Company
Anheuser-Busch
Automatic Data Processing, Inc.
Bank Leumi
Bayer
Bethlehem Steel
 CIT Group
Chemical Bank
The Dreyfus Corporation
Eastern Air Lines
Endicott Johnson Corporation
Erie Lackawanna Railway
European Coal and Steel Community (forerunner of the E.U.)
Ford Foundation
The Great Atlantic and Pacific Tea Company
ITT Corporation
Israel Discount Bank
Kingdom of Denmark
Kingdom of Norway
Ericsson, Sweden
Metromedia
Metropolis of Tokyo, Japan
Power Authority of the State of New York
RKO
Republic Aviation
Republic of Austria
Republic of Finland
Republic of Peru
Republic of the Philippines
Republic of Venezuela
Reynolds Metals Company
Rockwell Manufacturing Company
Rockwell-Standard Corp.
Southern Pacific Transportation Company
Stouffer's
Uniroyal
Mexico (United Mexican States)
Wagner Electric Corporation
Western Union Telegraph Company
Westinghouse Electric Corporation

Operating Entities
 Kuhn, Loeb & Co. Incorporated
 Kuhn, Loeb Asia Limited
 Kuhn, Loeb Government Securities Incorporated
 Kuhn, Loeb International Limited

Office Locations

Kuhn, Loeb & Co., had a number of homes throughout its existence:
 31 Nassau Street, New York, NY (1867)
 30 Nassau Street, New York, NY (1884)
 27 Pine Street, New York, NY (1894)
 52 William Street, New York, NY (1903)
 30 Wall Street, New York, NY, (May 31, 1955)
 40 Wall Street, New York, NY
 55 Water Street (as Lehman Brothers Kuhn Loeb)

Value of a Dollar
In 1867 Kuhn, Loeb & Co., was reputed to have been capitalized at $500,000.00.  In today's dollars, versus various benchmarks, this would be equal to:

 $7,029,288.70 using the Consumer Price Index
 $6,321,583.51 using the GDP deflator
 $55,096,551.72 using the unskilled wage
 $98,870,892.13 using the GDP per capita
 $791,998,799.52 using the United States Gross Domestic Product

Law Firms Representing Kuhn, Loeb & Co.
Guthrie, Cravath & Henderson L.L.P.
Dewey, Ballantine, Bushby, Palmer & Wood L.L.P.

References

Books
  Auletta, Ken. Greed and Glory on Wall Street: The Fall of the House of Lehman.  Random House, 1985
 Birmingham, Stephen.  Our Crowd: The Great Jewish Families of New York.  Pocket Books, 1977
 Chernow, Ron. The Warburgs.  Random House, 1993
 Collins, Theresa M. Otto Kahn: Art, Money & Modern Time. The University of North Carolina Press, 2002
 Kuhn, Loeb & Co. Kuhn, Loeb & Co.: A Century of Investment Banking.  New York: privately printed, 1967
 Kuhn, Loeb & Co.  Kuhn Loeb & Co.: Investment Banking Through Four Generations. privately printed, 1955
 Strauss, Lewis L. Men and Decisions. Doubleday, 1961
 Williams, Iain Cameron. The KAHNS of Fifth Avenue, iwp publishing, February 17, 2022,

Articles
The Gilded Age – Investment Bankers

External links
Citigroup's ancestor companies 1812 – 2000
Harriman v. Interstate Commerce Commission

Lehman Brothers
Banks based in New York City
Defunct financial services companies of the United States
Former investment banks of the United States
Financial services companies established in 1867
Banks established in 1867
Rockefeller family
Defunct companies based in New York (state)
Loeb family
Shearson Lehman/American Express